Karthikeya 2 is a 2022 Indian Telugu-language mystery action-adventure film written and directed by Chandoo Mondeti. The film serves as a sequel to the 2014 film Karthikeya and stars Nikhil Siddhartha, Anupama Parameswaran, and Anupam Kher. It is produced by Abhishek Agarwal Arts and People Media Factory. The plot follows Dr. Karthikeya who is on a quest to find the lost anklet of Lord Krishna.

The film was officially launched in March 2020. Principal photography commenced in February 2021 and ended in March 2022, with delays due to the COVID-19 pandemic. Filming took place in India, predominantly in Gujarat and Himachal Pradesh, in addition to Spain, Portugal, and Greece in Europe. The film's music composed by Kaala Bhairava with cinematography and editing done by Karthik Ghattamneni. Made on an budget of  crore, Karthikeya 2 was released on 13 August 2022 and received positive reviews from critics and emerged as a commercial success and 6th highest-grossing Telugu films of 2022.

National Iconic Awards Film Wons Two Awards Best Actor in Outstanding Performance of the year ( Nikhil Siddharth ) and Best Film ( Abhishek Agarwal ).

Plot 
Ranganath Rao, an archaeologist and professor visits a library in Greece and through a book, written by Ptolemy, he discovers that Lord Krishna, before the end of Dvapara Yuga, entrusted his friend and counceller Uddhava with his anklet, which is equipped with all the solutions for deadly problems, humans are going in face in the succeeding Kali Yuga.

In Hyderabad, Karthikeya "Karthik", a doctor who believes in science and logic is suspended for slapping a Mayor, who had attempted to perform a Yagna in the ICU for his son. At the same time, his father fractures his leg and an ox hits the plant of Tulasi in front of their house. Considering all the inauspicious occurrences, Karthik's mother believes that her family is being punished for not being able to fulfil a vow made to Lord Krishna, a few years ago. Therefore, Karthik takes her to Dwarka where his uncle Sadananda, an ardent devotee of Lord Krishna, lives. One night, Karthik crosses paths with a mortally wounded Ranganath Rao, who tries to tell something to him. When Karthik leaves to fetch an auto rikshaw for taking him to hospital and returns, he fails to find Rao. The following day, Karthik's mother goes missing and he searches for her with his uncle. He is arrested by the Police, who accuse him of murder and ask him what Rao had told him. When Karthik tells them that he was not able to interpret his words, the Police refuse to believe him. A girl, Mugdha, revealed to be Rao's granddaughter rescues Karthik from Police custody. A mysterious man attacks Karthik but stops when he sees the idol of Lord Krishna.

Karthik, Mugdha and Sadananda visit a sage to find about the man and learns that he belongs to the clan of Abheeras, an exiled community who resorted to dacoity but worshipped Lord Krishna. They wouldn't let the people, who tries to hinder with Krishna's belongings, live. Karthik finds his mother and determined to solve the mystery; he advises her to be safe at a 11-days-long Pravachan. They visit Rao's office in Bet Dwarka and read a letter, written by him. Rao had found that the anklet was hidden by Uddhava, who left behind clues to reach it, as the right person is destined to get that. For centuries, several people had tried to find the anklet but to no avail. Pallava King Suryavarman reached the closest and told the penultimate clue to Ptolemy, who hid the object with clue in Krishna Thatakam, which Rao was trying to utter when he met Karthik. Santanu, a professor in search of the anklet, kills Rao with evil intentions and was the one, responsible behind Karthik's arrest. Karthik finds a peacock-shaped object in Krishna Thatakam and Mugdha decodes the Sanskrit inscription written on it, that leads them to Govardhan Hill. The trio hire Suleman to take them to Govardhana Hill, Mathura without being caught by Police. Upon arriving there, they are apprehended by villagers, who are greedy for the prize money announced by Santanu for Karthik and Mugdha. They manage to convince the villagers of their objectives and climbs the hill to find an entrance, that they open using the peacock-shaped object and retrieve a telescope from it.

Next morning, Mugdha escapes with the telescope leaving Karthik, Sadananda and Suleman. Santanu apprehends the trio and leaves them in the desert to die but Mugdha arrives and rescues them, revealing that she had gone to her friend for finding about a person, who would help them in solving the mystery. Together, the foursome leave to Himachal Pradesh for meeting a blind philosopher Dr. Dhanvantari, who explains that Rao and Santanu were a part of secret society, that believed that the ancient India is far more advanced in technology than the modern world. When Santanu proposed to use the anklet for selfish reasons, Rao objected. The fate let Rao choose Karthik to carry his aim forward. Dhanvantari also explains that Krishna should be considered as a human rather than God, who was an extraordinary engineer for building his palace in midst of sea, a kinetic engineer for controlling Sudarshana Chakra, a doctor for knowing all the Ayurvedic treatment methods, a musician for being talented in playing flute, that helped as a music therapy and much more.

While returning, they are surrounded by the Police and therefore, Karthik travels on the truck through a frozen river, that begins to break. They manage to escape being drowned but are ambushed by an Abheera, who is forced to practice peace for 24 hours due to Krishna Paksha. Karthik observes the constellations on a hill, the next clue led to through the telescope, they found and finds the final location. They reach the final location but Abheera attacks to kill them. However, Karthik fights back and joins the telescope and peacock-shaped object forming the structure of flute, that he places in the hand of Lord Krishna's idol situated at the place. Therefore, the entry to the underground hallway filled with snakes, which protect the anklet is opened. Karthik uses his abilities to communicate with the snake to reach the anklet and wins nationwide fame. Abheeras surrender to Karthik while Santanu is brutally murdered by Abheeras.

Subsequently, Karthik embarks on a new mission to unfold the link between Krishna and deep waters of Atlantic Ocean.

Cast

Production 
The sequel to Karthikeya was announced in October 2017 by Nikhil Siddhartha through Twitter saying that it would commence from the end of 2018. However, due to delays from his previous film Arjun Suravaram, the film was officially launched in March 2020 in Tirupati with a puja ceremony.

Principal photography commenced in February 2021 and was shot in Gujarat and Himachal Pradesh. However, in March 2021 filming was stalled due to Nikhil suffering a leg injury. Filming then resumed in April 2021. In March 2022, the makers travelled to Spain, Portugal and Greece for the final schedule.

Soundtrack 
The film score and soundtrack album of the film is composed by Kaala Bhairava. The music rights were acquired by Zee Music Company. The full soundtrack album was released on 31 August 2022, while the Hindi version was released on 7 September 2022.

Release

Theatrical
Karthikeya 2 was released on 13 August 2022 in Telugu along with dubbed version in Hindi. In April 2022, it was announced that the film was going to release on 22 July 2022 but was later postponed to 12 August 2022 in order to avoid a clash with Thank You. It was later pushed back a day due to avoid a clash with another Telugu film, Macherla Niyojakavargam.

Zee Studios acquired theatrical, satellite and digital distribution rights of the film.

The Malayalam dubbed version of the film was released on 23 September 2022 in theatres across Kerala.

Home media
The post-theatrical digital streaming rights were acquired by ZEE5 and was premiered on 5 October 2022 (coinciding with Vijayadashami) in Telugu, Tamil and Hindi languages. According to ZEE5, the film garnered more than 100 crore viewing minutes within the first 48 hours.

Reception

Critical reception 
Karthikeya 2 opened to highly positive reviews from critics and audience. 

Dhaval Roy of The Times of India rated the Hindi version of the film 3.5 out of 5 stars and called it "an adventurous ride that's a grander and more exciting version of the first part." A reviewer for 123Telugu rated the film 3.25 out of 5 stars and noted, "Karthikeya 2 is a well made adventure thriller filled with great visuals and engaging narration". Jeevi of Idlebrain.com rated the film 3 out of 5 stars and said, "Karthikeya 2 is a decent adventurous mystic thriller that works." Neeshita Nyayapati of The Times of India rated the Telugu version of the film 3 out of 5 stars and wrote, "Karthikeya 2 remains a worthy successor to Karthikeya minus the over-the-top strong-arming of Nikhil's character by the end."

A critic for Sakshi Post rated the film 3 out of 5 stars and wrote, "Karthikeya 2 is a brilliant and stunning thriller." Satya Pulagam of ABP Desam rated the film 3 out of 5 stars and noted, "The story of Karthikeya 2 isn't as good as the first part, but the screenplay of Karthikeya 2 is gripping, especially the second half and the climax. Some of the scenes and the drama are extraordinary." A critic for Pinkvilla rated the film 3 out of 5 stars and said, "Karthikeya 2 executes quite a few dangerous events without building a proper context. The mood of this film is this: it's either spirituality, science or skepticism on display". Grace Cyril of India Today rated the film 1.5 out of 5 stars and wrote "Karthikeya 2 goes through various stages, but this journey could have been narrated in an easier manner."

A critic for Eenadu praised the backdrop, screenplay, and Nikhil's performance and called it an entertaining new journey. A critic for Andhra Jyothi called the film a 'spiritual thriller' and praised the director Chandoo Mondeti for giving the audience a new experience different from routine commercial films. Writing for The Hindu, Sangeetha Devi Dundoo opined that the premise is reminiscent of Ashwin Sanghi's book The Krishna Key. She further wrote, "Had the narrative been shorn of its preachy tone, Karthikeya 2 would have been a riveting thriller."

Box office 

The Hindi dubbed version of the film initially saw a limited theatrical release. However, due to public demand, number of shows were increased from 53 to 1575 within 5 days in North India. The Hindi version netted  at the domestic box office in the first three days. The film achieved its break even mark and entered into profit zone in 3 days. By the fourth week, the film has collected a total gross of $1.5 million at the United States box-office.

According to the media consulting firm Ormax Media, the domestic gross collection of the film was  crore, thus making it the highest-grossing film in India in August 2022 followed by Thiruchitrambalam and Laal Singh Chaddha. By the end of its theatrical run, Karthikeya 2 collected a worldwide gross of  crore with a distributor's share of  crore.

Future
Before the film's release, Mondeti announced his intentions to make Karthikeya 3. "I want to tell many stories of Karthikeya and want to make it into a franchise," Mondeti said in an interview with The New Indian Express. The final act of Karthikeya 2 sets the stage for Karthikeya 3.

Notes

References

External links
 
Karthikeya 2 on ZEE5
 

2020s Telugu-language films
2022 films
2022 action adventure films
Indian action adventure films
Indian supernatural thriller films
Films shot in Hyderabad, India
Films shot in Gujarat
Films set in Gujarat
Indian mystery thriller films
2020s mystery thriller films
2020s supernatural films
Films scored by Kaala Bhairava
Films shot in Spain
Films shot in Greece
Films shot in Portugal
Films set in Greece
Films set in Visakhapatnam